Jacobus "Ko" van Tongeren (August 19, 1913 – May 6, 1996) was a Dutch canoeist who competed in the 1936 Summer Olympics.

He was born in Haarlem and died in Velsen.

In 1936 he finished fourth in the K-1 10000 metre competition.

References
Sports-reference.com profile

1913 births
1996 deaths
Canoeists at the 1936 Summer Olympics
Dutch male canoeists
Olympic canoeists of the Netherlands
Sportspeople from Haarlem